Sir John Hubert Plunkett Murray  (29 December 1861 – 27 February 1940) was a judge and Lieutenant-Governor of Papua from 1908 until his death at Samarai.

Early life
Murray was born in Sydney, the son of Irish-born Terence Aubrey Murray (1810–73), and his second wife Agnes Ann, née Edwards; he was named after Terence Murray's friend John Hubert Plunkett. Murray was educated at a non-denominational school in Sydney, then attended a preparatory school in Melbourne in 1871. Between 1872 and 1877 Murray attended Sydney Grammar School where he won several sporting prizes and was school captain in 1877. He then moved to England in 1878 and attended Brighton College (which expelled him after he punched a master) and Oxford University, where he attended Magdalen College. A tall (6'3" or 190 cm), powerfully built man, Murray played rugby for Harlequins and won the English amateur heavyweight boxing title.

After university he entered the legal profession, and was called to the bar at the Inner Temple in 1885. he subsequently returned to New South Wales and worked at a legal practice in Sydney. In 1892 Murray became a legal draftsman for the Parliament of New South Wales but described his time there as "living death in Macquarie Street" and left in 1896 to lead a more adventurous life. He took an interest in the volunteer movement, and in 1898 was in command of the New South Wales Irish rifles. He was a Lieutenant-Colonel with the Australian Forces mounted infantry brigade in the Boer War. Murray held the rank of lieutenant-colonel in the Australian forces and of major in the Imperial service. Sir Hubert Murray was made a Companion of the Order Order of Saint Michael and Saint George (C.M.G.) in 1914, and a Knight Commander (K.C.M.G.) of the same order in 1925.

New Guinea
In 1904, Murray was appointed as a judge in what was still British New Guinea. He was appointed Acting Administrator in 1907 and Lieutenant-Governor in 1908, a position he held until his death at Samarai in 1940. When Murray first went to Papua there were 64 white residents.

He set himself to understand the native mind, and found that an appeal to vanity was often more effective than punishment. Murray eventually wiped out cannibalism and head-hunting, largely by ridiculing tribes that followed those practices, and praising those that did not. He was involved in controversy of the “dog incident”, when he attended a meeting called to suppress the activities of sorcerers (vadas or vatas), when local people attempted to demonstrate the power of their vadas by reviving a dog that had been killed.

Publications 
In 1912 Murray published Papua or British New Guinea, in which the chapters on "The Native Population" and "The Administration of justice" give good descriptions of the many problems he had to deal with. In 1925 his Papua of Today appeared, which showed the progress that had been made in carrying out his ideas. Portions of this book included material from pamphlets published by Murray in 1919 and 1920 on the Australian Administration in Papua, and Recent Exploration in Papua.

His sympathetic understanding of the native mind continued to be the strongest influence in his government. His policy had become more defined but its basis was always the "preservation of the native races, even of those weaker peoples who are not yet able to stand by themselves. The well-being and development of these peoples is declared by the League of Nations to form a sacred trust of civilization, and this declaration is entirely in accord with all the best traditions of British administration".

Murray held too that each native was an individual entitled to his own life, his own family, and his own village. He recognised that natives had their own codes of behaviour, and if these came into conflict with European codes no good could come from what he called the "swift injustice" of punitive expeditions.

He preferred to lead his people into better ways and he persuaded them to keep their villages clean, because only inferior races preferred dirt; to pay taxes, because a man who did not do so was a social defaulter; to be vaccinated, because that was a sign of government approval. He trained suitable men to be policemen, and he had Sydney University opened to others to be trained in first aid and rudimentary medicine to fit them to be assistants to white doctors. In some of these things Murray was only carrying on or extending what his predecessor Sir William MacGregor had begun, but it is an additional merit in an administrator to recognise the value of earlier men's work.

Murray was the leader of the Australasian delegates to the Pan-Pacific Science Congress held at Tokyo in 1926, and president of the meeting of the Australian and New Zealand Association for the Advancement of Science in 1932. He went steadily on with his work until he died at Samarai, Papua, on 27 February 1940.

The story is one of continued progress. Education for the indigenous people had increased, a beginning had been made with industrial enterprises, the population had begun to understand European modes of conducting business, and not a few of them had banking accounts. This had been accomplished with as little breaking down as possible of indigenous Papuan customs. 
Murray was succeeded as administrator by his nephew, Hubert Leonard Murray (1886-1963), who had been Official Secretary since 1916.

Family
The Murray family was among the early settlers of the Canberra district of New South Wales, where his father Sir Terence Aubrey Murray owned Yarralumla, and Windradeen, at Lake George. His grandfather, Captain Terence Murray, was a member of the Coldstream Guards and came to Australia as the paymaster for the 48th Regiment after having been the Paymaster of the Irish Brigade of Guards since 1811.

Hubert was the brother of Gilbert Murray, Professor of Greek at Oxford University, and, James Aubrey Gibbes Murray, the last child of Sir Terence Aubrey Murray's first marriage, to Mary Murray (nee Gibbes). Hubert Murray's sisters resided separately, at Yarralmula, with their grandparents Colonel and Elizabeth Gibbes, after the death of their mother. His sisters were: Leila Alexandrina Murray, who later became a governess for Lady Agnes Murray, and Evelyn Mary Matilda Murray, later 'Morrison', who joined Gilbert Murray in London, and participated in Pankhurst's Pankhurst's suffrage movement with her daughter, also Mary (pictured here on 'Black Friday' with Pankhurst). James 'Aubrey' Gibbes Murray, described by Gilbert as shy and retiring, was a draftsman for the NSW Department of Lands. Despite the distance, Gilbert's prolific correspondence kept the siblings and their children in close contact.

In 1889 Murray married Miss Sybil Maud Jenkins ( - 1929). They had three children:
 Mary, later married to Capt. Charles Robert Pinney, (1883 - 1945) Administrator of Norfolk Island from 1932 to 1937.
Mary and Charles had two children, Maura and Peter Pinney (1922 - 1992) noted travel writer. 
Peter married Alice Brown (1933 - 1995) and they had a daughter Sava Pinney (1959 -). Peter married for a second time to Estelle Runcie.
 Major Terence Murray, D.S.O., M.C.
Terence married Philippa Kitchener, niece of the first Lord Kitchener and they had three daughters, Molly, Sybil and Sheila.
Molly married Anthony Stallard, and they had two daughters, Carola Leonard and Serena Wallace. Carola married economist Michael Leonard, they had one daughter, photographer Crista Leonard. Serena married Australian Stephen Wallace and they had two sons, Matthew Wallace and Ollie Wallace. 
 Patrick Desmond Fitzgerald Murray D.Sc.(1900-1967), professor of Zoology at Sydney University
Patrick married Margery Holland.
Murray's brother Gilbert married Mary Howard, and they had a daughter Rosalind who married Arnold Toynbee. They had two sons, Philip and Lawrence.

On 20 February 1930 Hubert Murray married an Irish widow Mrs Mildred Blanche Vernon née Trench (1875 - 1960). They were later separated.

Legacy 
 In Port Moresby the PNG Army barracks (called Murray Barracks), the leading "international" primary school (called The Ela Murray International School), the Hubert Murray Stadium and the main highway are all named after him.
 The Official Papuan Collection, National Museum of Australia, over 3,000 items collected by Sir Hubert Murray for the Australian Territory of Papua, between 1907 and 1933, held in the National Museum of Australia.

Publications
 Papua, or British New Guinea, London: T. Fisher Unwin, 1912
 Recent Exploration in Papua, Sydney: Turner & Henderson, 192?
 Papua Of To-Day or An Australian Colony in the Making, London: P.S. King and Son, 1925
 Native Administration in Papua, Port Moresby, June 1929
 Are Missions Necessary?, Sydney: Australian Board of Missions, 1930
 Selected Letters of Hubert Murray (ed. Francis West), Melbourne: Melbourne University Press, 1970

Booklets
 Report by His Excellency the Lieut.-Governor of Papua to the Minister for home and territories on an article on "Three power rule in New Guinea" by Rinzo Gond, Port Moresby, 1919
 Review of the Australian administration in Papua from 1907 to 1920, Port Moresby, 192?
 Anthropology and the Government of Subject Races, Port Moresby, 1921
 The population problem in Papua : a paper read by J.H.P. Murray, Lieutenant-Governor of Papua, before the Pan-Pacific Conference, at Melbourne, 21st August, 1923, Port Moresby, 1923
 Notes on Colon Ainsworth's Report on the Mandated Territory of New Guinea, 1924
 Native custom and the government of primitive races with especial reference to Papua : a paper read at the third Pan-Pacific Science Congress, Tokyo, 1926, Port Moresby, 1926
 The Response of the Natives of Papua to Western Civilisation, Port Moresby, 1928
 Indirect rule in Papua : a paper read before the Australasian Association for the Advancement of Science at Hobart, in January 1928, Port Moresby, 1928
 Native Labour in Papua, London: Anti-Slavery and Aborigines Protection Society, 1929
 The Scientific Method as Applied to native Labour Problems in Papua, Port Moresby, 1931
 The scientific aspect of the pacification of Papua : presidential address at the meeting of the Australian and New Zealand Association for the Advancement of Science held at Sydney in August 1932, Port Moresby, 1932
 Notes on the Suggested Combination of the Administrations of Papua and New Guinea, 1939

Introductions
 T.F. Unwin, Patrolling in Papua, London: T.Fisher Unwin, 1923
 F.E. Williams, Orokaiva Society, Port Moresby, 1930
 F.E. Williams, Sentiments and Leading Ideas in Native Society, Port Moresby, 1932
 Ivan F. Champion, Across New Guinea from the Fly to the Sepik, London: Constable, 1932
 Lewis Lett, Knights Errant of Papua, Edinburgh: William Blackwood, 1935

References

Further reading
 Lewis Lett, Sir Hubert Murray of Papua: Statesman and Empire Builder, Collins, Sydney, 1949
 H. N. Nelson, "Murray, Sir John Hubert Plunkett (1861–1940)", Australian Dictionary of Biography vol. 10, National Centre of Biography (Australian National University), 1986. 
 Francis West, Hubert Murray: The Australian Pro-Consul, Oxford Uni. Press Melbourne, 1968
 Francis West, Selected Letters Of Hubert Murray, Oxford University Press Melbourne 1970

External links
 Australian National Museum Audio on Demand: Australia’s Official Papuan collection: Sir Hubert Murray and the how and why of a colonial collection, Sylvia Schaffarczyk, Australian National University, 21 March 2006

1861 births
1940 deaths
People from Sydney
Australian people of Irish descent
History of Papua New Guinea
Australian soldiers
People educated at Brighton College
People educated at Sydney Grammar School
Headhunting accounts and studies
Harlequin F.C. players
Australian military personnel of the Second Boer War
Australian Knights Commander of the Order of St Michael and St George
Governors of the Territory of Papua
Territory of Papua judges
Australian people of English descent